Wushour Silamu or Wushour Slamu (born 15 October 1941), is a Chinese computer scientist of Uyghur nationality. He is a professor at Xinjiang University in Ürümqi and specializes in multilingual computing, especially with reference to the Uyghur language and other minority languages of Xinjiang.

Biography
Wushour was born in Yining, Xinjiang in 1941 and graduated from the Department of Physics at Xinjiang University in June 1964. He has held positions at Xinjiang University as vice-chair of the Department of Electronic Engineering and chair of the Department of Computing and is currently director of the Xinjiang Multilingual Information Processing Key Laboratory.

Wushour is an expert member of the WG2 working group of the ISO/IEC JTC 1/SC 2 subcommittee for coded character sets and has attended international meetings of the working group between 1994 and 2015. He has authored a number of proposals to encode characters required for Uyghur Arabic alphabet in the Unicode Standard, as well as a proposal to encode the Old Turkic script.

In 2011, Wushour was elected as the first Uyghur academician of the Chinese Academy of Engineering (CAE).

Wushour was elected as a Xinjiang delegate to the 12th National People's Congress which was convened from 2013 to 2018.

References

External links

 Xinjiang University page for Wushour Silamu

1941 births
Chinese computer scientists
Delegates to the 12th National People's Congress
Delegates to the National People's Congress from Xinjiang
Educators from Xinjiang
Living people
Members of the Chinese Academy of Engineering
People from Ili
People involved with Unicode
Uyghur people
Academic staff of Xinjiang University